Georgia v. Brailsford, 2 U.S. (2 Dall.) 402 (1792), was a United States Supreme Court case in which the Court held that "[a] State may sue in the Supreme Court to enjoin payment of a judgment in behalf of a British creditor taken on a debt, which was confiscated by the State, until it can be ascertained to whom the money belongs".

The case was the first United States Supreme Court case where a state appeared as a party. It includes an opinion from Thomas Johnson, who joined the court on November 7, 1791, and resigned after fourteen months.

References

External links
 

United States Supreme Court cases
United States Supreme Court cases of the Jay Court
1792 in United States case law
Legal history of Georgia (U.S. state)